Something's Missing may refer to:

Music
Something's Missing (In My Life) composed by Paul Jabara and Jay Asher, and recorded by various artists.
"Something's Missing" Paul Jabara duet with Donna Summer from Keeping Time
"Something's Missing", song by John Mayer from Heavier Things and As/Is
Something's Missing (Sheppard song) 2014
"Something's Missing", a single by Five Stairsteps and Cubie, written by	Clarence Burke, Jr. Clarence Burke, Snr. 1967
"Something's Missing", a song by  Bloodstone  	 Love	1975
"Something's Missing", a single by The Chords [UK 80s]  Chris Pope	  Polydor  UK	1980